Calgary Girls Charter School (CGCS) is an all-female public charter school in Calgary, Alberta, Canada.  It currently teaches grades 4–9.

Established in 2003, the school operates at two sites.  Grades 4-5 are located at the Bel Aire campus, and students in grades 6-9 are located at the Lakeview campus. Students at CGCS are required to wear a uniform. 

Calgary Girls Charter School is renowned for its "Go Girls" curriculum in which girls talk about image, bullying, and the amount of pressure placed on girls.

The CGCS is administered by the Calgary Girls' School Society, a non-profit organization dedicated exclusively to administering the  school. As one of 13 charter schools in Alberta, CGCS operates with its own board of directors, and is accountable directly to the Minister of Education. As a public charter school, it receives the same provincial funding per student of any public school. With public funding comes the obligation to accept any female student that it is able to accommodate, without charging tuition. Like any public Alberta school, it is allowed to charge fees, but they are not tied to the right of admission.

Opposition
The Calgary Board of Education (CBE) and its main union are generally opposed to the idea of charter schools.  Organizers of the CGCS initially (as required by law) applied to get the same school run under the authority of the CBE.  However certain policies of the CGCS compelled the CBE to reject them.  For instance, one CGCS policy is to give parents a more significant role in evaluating teachers.

References

External links

Girls' schools in Canada
Charter schools in Canada
Middle schools in Calgary
Elementary schools in Calgary
Educational institutions established in 2003
2003 establishments in Alberta